Carl Hite is an American academic administrator who is the President of Cleveland State Community College. He received his bachelor's degree from Florida State University, and his Doctorate of Philosophy in Higher Education Administration from the University of Florida.

References

External links
Hite's Presidential Message
St. Petersburg Times article about Hite
Hite's profile on Educause

Florida State University alumni
University of Florida College of Education alumni
Living people
Heads of universities and colleges in the United States
Year of birth missing (living people)